The River Suir (or Abhainn na Siúire ) is a river in Ireland that flows into the Atlantic Ocean through Waterford after a distance of .
The catchment area of the Suir is 3,610 km2.
Its long term average flow rate is 76.9 cubic metres per second (m3/s), about twice the flow of either the River Barrow (37.4 m3/s) or the River Nore (42.9 m3/s) before these join, but a little less than the Barrow's flow when it meets the Suir 20 km downstream (over 80 m3/s).

Popular with anglers, it holds plentiful reserves of brown trout and salmon. While the Suir holds the record for a salmon taken from an Irish river (weighing 57 lb/26 kg, taken on a fly in 1874), as is the case in many other Atlantic rivers, salmon stocks have been in decline in recent years.

Rising on the slopes of Devil's Bit Mountain, just north of Templemore in County Tipperary, the Suir flows south through Loughmore, Thurles, Holycross, Golden and Knockgraffon. Merging with the River Aherlow at Kilmoyler and further on with the Tar, it turns east at the Comeragh Mountains, forming the border between County Waterford and County Tipperary. It then passes through Cahir, Clonmel and Carrick-on-Suir before reaching Waterford. Near the Port of Waterford it meets the River Barrow at Cheekpoint to form a wide navigable estuary, capable of accommodating seagoing vessels up to 32,000 tons dwt. It exits to the sea between Dunmore East and Hook Head.

Together with the Nore and the Barrow, the river is one of the trio known as The Three Sisters.

The Suir is known in Irish as the Siúr and it is thought the present spelling in English with the u and i reversed is due to a mistake. Some people therefore feel that the spelling in English should be Siur and this spelling is occasionally seen as Siur. Edmund Spenser (1552–1599) author of The Fairie Queene, in his writings during the Elizabethan age while domiciled in County Cork, referred to the "gentle Shure", probable a most accurate spelling and the most phonetically correct of the period.

In the early years of the 21st century, the remains of a very large Viking settlement were found at a bend in the river at Woodstown just upstream from Waterford.

In Clonmel, the Suir floods the local area after very heavy rainfalls falling in the up river catchment of 2,173 km2. The Office of Public Works (OPW) completed and installed a Flood Forecasting System which was used to forecast flooding in January 2008 and January 2009, the flooding of January 2009 being a 1 in 5-year event. Phase 1 of the Clonmel Flood defence (1–100-year) which stated in 2007 is scheduled for completion in late 2009 and phase two and three as one contract by 2011/2012. The flood defence consists of demountable barriers, walls and earth banks. The Gashouse Bridge, Coleville Road, Davis Road, the quays and the Old Bridge are generally the worst affected areas.

Carrick-on-Suir is tidal and has a 1–50-year flood defence. The Office of Public Works (OPW) now plan to install a 1–200-year flood defence where the river Suir flows through Waterford city.

See also
Rivers of Ireland

References

External links

Salmon Ireland, information on the Salmon rivers of Ireland
The Suir Navigation from Carrick to Clonmel

Geography of Waterford (city)
Rivers of County Waterford
Rivers of County Kilkenny
Rivers of County Tipperary